Nong Na Kham is a district (amphoe) of Khon Kaen province, northeastern Thailand.

History
The minor district (king amphoe) was established on 30 April 1994 by splitting it from Phu Wiang district. It includes Baan Non Nok Tha (th: บ้านโนนนกทา)  (E 102°18'17" N 16°47'57"), and Ban Na Di (th: บ้านนาดี) (E 102°18'04" N 16°48'02") Prehistoric Thailand archaeological sites.

On 15 May 2007, all 81 minor districts in Thailand were upgraded to full districts. On 24 August, the upgrade became official.

Geography
Neighboring districts are (from the north clockwise): Si Bun Rueang and Non Sang of Nong Bua Lamphu province; Phu Wiang, Wiang Kao and Si Chomphu of Khon Kaen Province.

Administration
The district is divided into three subdistricts (tambons), which are further subdivided into 34 villages (mubans). There are no municipal (thesabans). There are three tambon administrative organizations (TAO).

References

External links
amphoe.com

Nong Na Kham